The 2014 Seguros Bolívar Open Medellín was a professional tennis tournament played on outdoor clay courts. It was the first edition of the tournament and part of the 2014 ITF Women's Circuit, offering a total of $50,000+H in prize money. It took place in Medellín, Colombia, on 31 March – 6 April 2014.

ATP singles main draw entrants

Seeds

 1 Rankings are as of July 15, 2013.

Other entrants
The following players received wildcards into the singles main draw:
  David Konstantinov
  Carlos Salamanca
  Juan-Carlos Spir
  Michael Quintero

The following players received entry from the qualifying draw:
  Bruno Sant'anna
  Fabiano de Paula
  Marcelo Arévalo
  Dennis Novikov

WTA singles main draw entrants

Seeds 

 1 Rankings as of 17 March 2014

Other entrants 
The following players received wildcards into the singles main draw:
  Anna Katalina Alzate Esmurzaeva
  Yuliana Lizarazo
  Yuliana Monroy

The following players received entry from the qualifying draw:
  Martina Caregaro
  Maria Marfutina
  Denise Muresan
  Gaia Sanesi

The following player received entry by a junior exempt: 
  Varvara Flink

Champions

Men's singles

 Austin Krajicek def.  João Souza 7–5, 6–3

Women's singles 

  Verónica Cepede Royg def.  Irina-Camelia Begu 6–4, 4–6, 6–4

Men's doubles

 Austin Krajicek /  César Ramírez def.  Roberto Maytín /  Andrés Molteni 6–3, 7–5

Women's doubles 

  Irina-Camelia Begu /  María Irigoyen def.  Monique Adamczak /  Marina Shamayko 6–2, 7–6(7–2)

External links 
 2014 Seguros Bolívar Open Medellín at ITFtennis.com
  

2014 ITF Women's Circuit
2014
2014
2014 in Colombian tennis